Karimabad (also Romanized as Karīmābād; also known as Karim Abad Mo’men Abad) is a village in Mud Rural District, Mud District, Sarbisheh County, South Khorasan Province, Iran. At the 2006 census, its population was 85, in 26 families.

References 

Populated places in Sarbisheh County